The 2020 Orange County SC season is the club's tenth season of existence, and their tenth consecutive season in the United Soccer League Championship, the second tier of American soccer. Orange County will also compete in the U.S. Open Cup.

Current roster

Current roster

Technical Staff

Competitions

USL Championship

Standings — Group B

Match results
On December 20, 2019, the USL announced the 2020 season schedule, creating the following fixture list for the early part of Orange County's season.

In the preparations for the resumption of league play following the shutdown prompted by the COVID-19 pandemic, the remainder of Orange County's schedule was announced on July 2.

U.S. Open Cup 

As a USL Championship club, Orange County will enter the competition in the Second Round, to be played April 7–9.

References

Orange County SC seasons
Orange County SC
Orange County SC
Orange County SC